Catherine Sulem  (born 1957) is a mathematician and violinist at the University of Toronto.

She has completed a monograph "Nonlinear Schrodinger Equation: Self-Focusing Instability and Wave Collapse" together with her brother Pierre-Louis Sulem, which appears in applied Mathematical Sciences.

Awards and honours
Sulem is the winner of the fourth Krieger–Nelson Prize, for "important breakthroughs in understanding of many nonlinear phenomena associated with the focusing nonlinear Schrödinger equation and the water wave problem". She is also a fellow of the American Mathematical Society. In 2015, she was elected a Fellow of the Royal Society of Canada.
In 2018 the Canadian Mathematical Society listed her in their inaugural class of fellows.
In 2019 she gave the AWM-SIAM Sonia Kovalevsky Lecture, entitled The Dynamics of Ocean Waves, at the 7th ICIAM  in Valencia. This lecture is awarded jointly by Association of Women in Mathematics and SIAM. In 2020, Sulem was awarded the CRM-Fields-PIMS Prize, the premier Canadian research prize in the mathematical sciences.

Selected publications
Books
.

Research articles
.
.
.
.
.

References

External links
 Professor of Mathematics, University of Toronto
 List of Publications

1957 births
Living people
Algerian mathematicians
French mathematicians
Canadian mathematicians
Canadian women academics
Academic staff of the University of Toronto
Algerian violinists
Canadian classical violinists
Fellows of the American Mathematical Society
People from Nice
University of Paris alumni
French women mathematicians
Fellows of the Royal Society of Canada
Fellows of the Canadian Mathematical Society
21st-century Canadian violinists and fiddlers
21st-century Algerian people
Canadian women violinists and fiddlers